Danijel Aleksić (Serbian Cyrillic: Дaниjeл Aлeкcић; born 30 April 1991) is a Serbian professional footballer who plays for Turkish club İstanbul Başakşehir.

Early life
Born in Pula, SR Croatia, Yugoslavia, Aleksić was several months old when his mother fled to Serbia due to the ongoing Croatian War of Independence. Aleksić never met his biological father and carries his mother's last name.

Club career
Aleksić started playing football at seven years of age in a local club Veternik. By the age of 11, he transferred to Vojvodina where he made it through every age group. Simultaneous to football he attended Jovan Vukanović streamlined technical high school.

Vojvodina
On 5 May 2007, he made his senior debut for Vojvodina under head coach Milovan Rajevac in a league match away at Red Star Belgrade. Being only 16 years and five days old, Aleksić became the second-youngest player ever to appear in a Serbian SuperLiga match (behind Slavko Perović). By the end of the 2006–07 season, he recorded one more league appearance.

He scored his first league goal on 2 April 2008, in a 4–1 home win versus Hajduk Kula.

During Vojvodina's 2008–09 season opening league match, a derby versus Red Star Belgrade, Aleksić scored a 90th-minute goal to put the game beyond reach and ensure a famous 2–0 win for his team. In November 2008, Aleksić started to figure as a transfer target for Serbia's biggest clubs – Red Star and Partizan – however, Vojvodina officials at the time were adamant that they would never sell him to league competitors. In late March 2009, he reportedly also started getting attention form abroad with scouts from Real Madrid and Villarreal coming to watch him play for the Serbian U19 national squad. For his part, in mid May 2009, Aleksić said that he would prefer his first transfer abroad to be to Holland's Eredivisie or Germany's Bundesliga.

Genoa
On 19 January 2010, the highly rated youngster was signed by Genoa.

He became the club's second Serbian signing of the season, after Nenad Tomović. Playing under head coach Gian Piero Gasperini, Aleksić made his Serie A debut against Juventus on 14 February 2010, coming on as the 88th-minute substitute for Domenico Criscito, a game which Genoa lost 3–2. The brief minutes-long runout remained his only league appearance until the end of the 2009–10 Serie A season.

The arrival of striker Luca Toni to Genoa in the summer of 2010 meant that Aleksić became surplus to club's current requirements so, on 1 July, the youngster was set to be loaned out to Serie B club Crotone. However, he refused the transfers and eventually remained at Genoa. But only until the end of 2010 summer transfer window, when he got loaned to 2. Bundesliga club SpVgg Greuther Fürth until the end of the season 2010–11.

On 28 June 2011, Austria Wien confirmed Aleksić was on trial.

Kavala
Greek media wrote on 21 August 2011, that Genoa loaned him to Kavala, but after a couple of weeks, the Greek team was expelled from the Super League Greece and relegated to the Delta Ethniki League, so the loan was canceled and the player returned to Genoa.

Lechia Gdańsk
Aleksić joined Lechia Gdańsk during the 2014 summer transfer window on a two-year contract, making his debut in a 3–1 defeat to Wisła Kraków. After a poor start with the club Aleksić quickly found himself playing for the second team and received criticism for his performances with the first team. After six months with the club Aleksić's performances made him become surplus to requirements and he was sold to St. Gallen in February 2015. He made four first-team appearances at Lechia, failing to score, but had more success with the Lechia II team scoring three goals in six appearances.

International career
Aleksić has the distinction of being the only player to appear for four different age-level national squads during a single calendar year. In 2008, he turned out for Serbian U17 (cadets), U19 (juniors), U21, and senior teams.

Youth level
Aleksić was the captain of the Serbian U17 national football team. In the 2008 campaign of the qualifying tournament's elite round held over five days in late March 2008, Aleksić scored five goals in three matches (three from open play and two penalties) as Serbia qualified top of the group for the final tournament. In addition to his five goals, the team scored only one more – scored by Adem Ljajić. Aleksić led his team single-handedly all the way to the final group stage and was the main contender for the U17 golden boot award for most goals.

In May 2008 at the 2008 UEFA European Under-17 Football Championship in Turkey he scored a spectacular bicycle kick goal in the first match against Scotland as well as adding the second for a 2–0 final score. The next group match pitted Serbia versus the Netherlands, and despite dominating the proceedings the team could not convert due, in no small part, to the heroics of Dutch goalie Jeroen Zoet – in the end, Serbia lost 1–0. The final and deciding group match was against Turkey and Serbia again missed their share of goalscoring chances including Aleksić hitting the woodwork – the match ended 0–0 meaning that Serbia finished third in the group and did not progress to the semifinals.

Senior national team
Aleksić made his senior national team debut as a 17-year-old in December 2008 under head coach Radomir Antić in a friendly versus Poland, making him one of the youngest debutantes ever. The match was played in Belek, Turkey. His next appearance came almost ten years later when he entered late in a UEFA Nations League outing against Lithuania.

Career statistics

Club

International

Honours
Saint-Étienne
French League Cup: 2013

İstanbul Başakşehir
Süper Lig: 2019–20

Individual
UEFA European Under-17 Championship Golden Player Award: 2008

References

External links
 Danijel Aleksić at reprezentacija.rs 
 

1991 births
Living people
Sportspeople from Pula
Serbs of Croatia
Serbian footballers
Serbian expatriate footballers
Association football forwards
Serbia international footballers
Serbia under-21 international footballers
Serbia youth international footballers
FK Vojvodina players
Genoa C.F.C. players
SpVgg Greuther Fürth players
AS Saint-Étienne players
AC Arlésien players
Lechia Gdańsk players
Lechia Gdańsk II players
FC St. Gallen players
Yeni Malatyaspor footballers
Al-Ahli Saudi FC players
Serbian SuperLiga players
Serie A players
2. Bundesliga players
Ligue 1 players
Ligue 2 players
Ekstraklasa players
Swiss Super League players
Süper Lig players
Saudi Professional League players
Expatriate footballers in Italy
Expatriate footballers in Germany
Expatriate footballers in France
Expatriate footballers in Poland
Expatriate footballers in Switzerland
Expatriate footballers in Turkey
Expatriate footballers in Saudi Arabia
Serbian expatriate sportspeople in Italy
Serbian expatriate sportspeople in Germany
Serbian expatriate sportspeople in France
Serbian expatriate sportspeople in Poland
Serbian expatriate sportspeople in Switzerland
Serbian expatriate sportspeople in Turkey
Serbian expatriate sportspeople in Saudi Arabia
Yugoslav Wars refugees
Refugees in Serbia
Serbian people of Croatian descent